Hofmeyr is a small Karoo town in the Eastern Cape Province of South Africa, 20 km west of the Bamboesberg mountain range. It lies 64 km north-east of Cradock at an altitude of 1,252 metres. According to the 2011 census, the population of Hofmeyr proper is about 326 persons and the neighbouring township of Luxolweni is about 3354. In former times it lay at the centre of a flourishing sheep-farming district and managed some salt pans 10 km to its west.

Founded in 1873, the town was initially named Maraisburg. To avoid confusion with the Gauteng area of Maraisburg it was renamed Hofmeyr in 1911  in honour of Jan Hendrik Hofmeyr (Onze Jan), a campaigner for the equal treatment of Afrikaans and English and a prominent figure in the Eerste Taalbeweging.

The Hofmeyr Skull, belonging to a 36,000 year old anatomically modern human, was found in 1952 in the dry wash of the Vlekpoort River just outside Hofmeyr.

References

External links

Populated places in the Enoch Mgijima Local Municipality
Populated places established in 1873
Karoo